Robert Gilfillan (14 March 1926 – June 2018) was a Scottish professional footballer who played as an inside forward.

Career
Born in Dunfermline, Gilfillan played for Jeanfield Swifts, Blackpool, Cowdenbeath, Rochdale and Worcester City.

References

1926 births
2018 deaths
Scottish footballers
Jeanfield Swifts F.C. players
Blackpool F.C. players
Cowdenbeath F.C. players
Rochdale A.F.C. players
Worcester City F.C. players
Scottish Football League players
English Football League players
Footballers from Dunfermline
Association football inside forwards